Ghaleb Awwali was a senior Amal Movement and later Lebanese Islamic Jihad official who was assassinated in a car bombing in Beirut, Lebanon in a Hezbollah controlled area,  on 19 July 2004.  Hezbollah blamed Israel and the Jund Ash Sham organization but offered no evidence, while others blamed Hezbollah itself, as Awwali had been active independently, and had been involved with Sunni Palestinian militant organizations. Ghaleb Awwali has been called a martyr of Lebanon and a martyr of Palestine. Hezbollah officials have claimed that the Zionist movement is behind the attacks and have claimed that Jund Ash Sham is linked to Israel, but have offered no evidence.

References

Year of birth missing
2004 deaths
Assassinated Lebanese politicians
Lebanese Shia Muslims